Pereilema is a genus of Latin American plants in the grass family.

 Species
 Pereilema beyrichianum (Kunth) Hitchc. - Mexico (Chiapas), Guatemala, Costa Rica, Venezuela (Anzoátegui), Colombia, Ecuador, Peru (Junín), Brazil (São Paulo, D.F., Goiás)
 Pereilema ciliatum E.Fourn. - Mexico (Jalisco, Michoacán, Nayarit, Morelos, Veracruz, Sinaloa, Zacatecas, Oaxaca, Chiapas, Guerrero), Guatemala, El Salvador
 Pereilema crinitum J.Presl - Mexico, Central America, Venezuela, Colombia, Ecuador, Brazil (Minas Gerais)
 Pereilema diandrum R.W.Pohl - Costa Rica

References

Chloridoideae
Poaceae genera